Get Damaged is a 2008 EP album by Be Your Own Pet, released by their UK label XL Recordings.  It features three tracks from XL's international release of the band's second album, Get Awkward, that were removed by Universal Records (distributor for the band's US label, Ecstatic Peace) from the US version for being "too violent".

Track listing

References

2008 EPs
Be Your Own Pet albums
XL Recordings EPs